Crenicichla coppenamensis is a species of cichlid native to South America. It is found in the Coppename and Saramacca River drainages in Suriname.

References

coppenamensis
Fish of Suriname
Taxa named by Alex Ploeg
Fish described in 1987